Rommel C. Banlaoi (27 April 1970) is a Filipino political scientist, security analyst, and an international studies expert. He was nominated and designated as a Deputy National Security Adviser with the rank of Undersecretary in July 2022 to lead in the transition process but he has returned to his work as an independent scholar specializing in peace, counterterrorism, geopolitics, and security studies.  He is a celebrity professor and policy influencer known for his scholarly works on international terrorism (specifically on the Abu Sayyaf Group), South China disputes, foreign affairs and geopolitical issues. He is the Chairman of the Philippine Institute for Peace, Violence and Terrorism Research (PIPVTR) and President of the Philippine Society for Intelligence and Security Studies (PSISS), both academic and non-governmental organizations.

Education

Banlaoi finished his BA and MA in Political Science at the University of the Philippines in Diliman where he also worked on his PhD in Political Science (ABD Status).  He earned his PhD in International Relations at Jinan University in Guangzhou, China.

Career
Banlaoi began his career as Instructor in Political Science at the University of the Philippines Los Banos (1992-1995). and a University Research Associate at the University of the Philippines in Diliman (1996). Afterwards, he became Assistant Professor of International Studies at De La Salle University (1997-1998). He was a Professor of Political Science and International Relations at the National Defense College of the Philippines (1998-2008) where he was also designated as Vice President from 1998-2001.  Prior to his academic stint at NDCP, he worked at the Office of the Secretary of National Defense (OSND) during the administration of President Joseph Estrada. While at NDCP, he was detailed to the Office of the Assistant Secretary for Plans and Programs (OASPP) during the administration of President Gloria Macapagal Arroyo. It was also during the term of President Arroyo when Banlaoi served as a senior adviser at the League of Municipalities of the Philippines (LMP), founding Director of the Mayor's Development Center (MDC), and a consultant at the National Counter-Terrorism Action Group (NACTAG), the forerunner of the Philippine Anti-Terrorism Council (ATC) established by the Human Security Act of 2007, otherwise known as the Philippine Anti-Terrorism Law currently replaced by the Philippine Anti_Terrorism Law of 2020.  He was then appointed as a member of the Advisory Council of the Criminal Investigation and Detection Group (CIDG) of the Philippine National Police (PNP) during the administration of President Benigno Simeon Aquino III.  He was also appointed member to the Advisory Council of the PNP Drug Enforcement Group (PDEG) under the administration of President Rodrigo Roa Duterte. In 2021, he was reappointed as member of the National Advisory Group of the CIDG and eventually elected as its Vice Chairman for External Affairs.  Banlaoi also received appointment as Professor and Director for Research and Publication at the World City College (WCC)in 2004-2005 and member of the Board of Regents of the University of Eastern Pangasinan (UEP) in 2006.  Since 2011, he has been teaching at the Department of International Studies at Miriam College, the Philippines.

Awards
Banlaoi received in June 2021 the Award for Outstanding Contribution in the Promotion of Philippines-China Understanding offered by the Association of Philippines-China Understanding (APCU) and the Chinese Embassy in the Philippines.  Because of his involvement in peace education, terrorism research and non-violence studies,  he received the Albani Peace Prize Award for Peace Education.  He also received the "Kahanga-hangang Pilipino" (Outstanding Filipino) Award in 2012 for peace research and national security education.  On the occasion of the 2016 World CSR (Corporate Social Responsibility) Congress Day in Mumbai, India, Banlaoi received the Award for Outstanding Contribution to Humanitarian and Social Cause.  Banlaoi has been called "the father of Philippine counter-terrorism research" and the "leading Philippine scholar" studying radical Islam.

Affiliations
Dr. Banlaoi is currently the Chairman of the Board of Advisers of the China Studies Center of the School of International Relations at New Era University. He served as the President of the Philippine Association for Chinese Studies (PACS) from 2018 to 2022  and became a member of the Management Board of the World Association for Chinese Studies (WACS) in 2019.  He is currently the Director of the Center for the Study of Philippines-China Relations (CSPCR), the research arm of the Philippines-China Friendship Society (PCFS) where he serves as a co-convenor representing the Philippine side. He is also a member of the International Panel of Experts of the Maritime Awareness Project (MAP)  of the National Bureau of Asian Research (NBR) and the Sasakawa Peace Foundation (SPF) based in Washington DC, while serving as member of the Board of Directors of the China-Southeast Asia Research Centre on the South China Sea based in Hainan, China. He served as a member of the Philippine Council for Foreign Relations (PCFR) and a Senior Fellow at the Yuchengco Centre (YC) of De La Salle University (DLSU) where three of his scholarly works were published.   He is an Adjunct Research Professor at the National Institute for South China Sea Studies based in Hainan, China. Banlaoi contributes to the official publications of the Southeast Asian Regional Center for Counter-Terrorism (SEARCCT) based in Kuala Lumpur.  He served as Chairman of the Council for Asian Terrorism Research, a consortium of some of the best research organizations on counter-terrorism research in respective country of the Asia Pacific region. He was also appointed as a Non-Resident Fellow of the Center for Global Counterterrorism Cooperation based in New York City.  He was a Fellow of the Asia Pacific Center for Asia Pacific Studies (APCSS) based in Hawaii, USA and Visiting Fellow at the Faculty of Law of Leiden University, the Netherlands.  He is currently the Convenor of the Network for the Prevention of Violent Extremism in the Philippines (NPVEP).

Trivia
Banlaoi appeared in Eraserhead's second album, Circus.  Eraserheads (sometimes stylized as ERASƎRHEADS or ƎRASƎRHƎADS) is a Filipino rock band formed in 1989. He is also the basis of a fictional character, Counsilor/Prof. Banlaoi,  in a successful Philippine musical, Ang Huling El Bimbo.

Books
Philippines-China Relations at 45 During the COVID-19 Pandemic: New Discoveries, Recent Developments, and Continuing Concerns
The Marawi Siege and Its Aftermath:  The Continuing Terrorist Threats
Philippines-China Relations:  Geopolitics, Economics and Counterterrorism<
Al-Harakatul Al-Islamiyyah:  Essays on the Abu Sayyaf Group, Terrorism in the Philippines from Al Qaeda to ISIS
Marawi City Siege and Threats of Narcoterrorism in the Philippines.
Philippine Security in the Age of Terror 
Philippines-China Security Relations: Current Issues and Emerging Concerns
Security Aspects of Philippines-China Relations
Defense and Military Cooperation Between the Philippines and China:  Broadening Bilateral Ties in the Post 9/11 Era
Current and Emerging Security Environment in Southeast Asia
De-radicalization Efforts in the Philippines: Options for Disengagement Strategy
Al Harakatul Al Islammiyah:Essays on the Abu Sayyaf Group
Counter-Terrorism Measures in Southeast Asia: How Effective Are They;
 War on Terrorism in Southeast Asia.
Maritime Terrorism in Southeast Asia:  The Abu Sayyaf Threat
The Philippines and Australia:  Defense and Security Cooperation Against Terrorism
The ASEAN Regional Forum, the South China Sea Conflict and the Functionalist Option
Security Cooperation in the ASEAN Regional Forum and in the European Union:  Lessons Learned
The Amsterdam Treaty and the European Union's Common Foreign and Security Policy''Political Parties in the PhilippinesElections in the Philippines''

References

1970 births
Living people
Security studies
Filipino political scientists
University of the Philippines Diliman alumni